The Jane Pickens Show is the title of an American television series which aired in 1954 on ABC and a radio program broadcast on NBC from 1948 to 1949 and again from 1951 to 1957.

TV series
It was a music program aired in a 15-minute time-slot, and starred popular radio singer Jane Pickens. Music programs aired in 15-minute time-slots were a common type of show on the then-"Big 4" U.S. networks, with many popular singers such as Dinah Shore, Eddie Fisher, Perry Como etc. doing such series. They typically ran for 12–13 minutes excluding the ads, and many accompanied the evening news, which in those days was also 15-minutes.

Episode status
Four episodes are held by the UCLA Film and Television Archive. It is not known if any other episodes survive. Although a great deal of research has been done into the archival status of rival network DuMont, little research has been done into the archival status of ABC shows, even though they (and other American networks) are known to have wiped much of their 1950s output.

Radio
The Jane Pickens Show began on NBC radio on June 29, 1948, as a summer program. It returned on October 24, 1948, running until March 20, 1949, and returned again on July 4, 1949, ending on August 22, 1949. A longer run began on February 5, 1951, and continued until June 12, 1955. The show's final radio run (also known as Pickens Party) began on December 3, 1955, and ended on April 13, 1957.

Besides Pickens, Jack Kilty was heard regularly on the show in 1948 and Bob Houston was a regular in 1949. Robert Warren was the announcer in 1948. Norman Cloutier led the orchestra in 1948–49. Edwin L. Dunham was the program's director.

References

External links
The Jane Pickens Show on IMDb

1954 American television series debuts
1954 American television series endings
1950s American variety television series
American Broadcasting Company original programming
English-language television shows
Black-and-white American television shows
1940s American radio programs
1950s American radio programs
1948 radio programme debuts
1957 radio programme endings
NBC radio programs
American music radio programs